Captain Zeppos was a Belgian children's television series, which aired in 1964 and 1968. It was based on a script by Lode De Groof. In all, the BRT made three series with a Flemish actor, Senne Rouffaer, in the title role. All episodes, except episode 16 which is a recap, have been released on DVD with Dutch subtitles and extras.

Storylines

Series 1 – Belderbos – 15 episodes (1964)
A strange man arrives in Belder on horseback, and introduces himself as Captain Zeppos. Initially, he is met with suspicion and jealousy, but he soon befriends a local, Ben Kurrel. It becomes apparent that Zeppos had a motive to come to Belder: when in Greece a stranger had made him an offer on a piece of land he had inherited near the town. Ben Kurrel and his friend Rita Mees help him investigate the mystery.

Series 2 – De Eglantier – 8 episodes (1968)
Strange things happen in Belder - a group of hunters are regularly spotted around town, and Zeppos' wife Arianne meets 'Aunt Cara' a mysterious woman who can stand on her head. All seems to revolve around art theft in nearby churches.

Series 3 – Tweng – 8 episodes (1968)
Tweng is a pacifist organisation led by Mr Elias, who asks Zeppos to take charge of his cause, as he is lacking the strength to continue. His daughter Marleen is Tweng's secretary and will help Zeppos.

Cast

Senne Rouffaer - Captain Zeppos/Uncle Nico
Raymond Bossaerts - Ben Kurrel
Raymond Verhaeghe - Alfred Kurrel
Jo Nupie - Agnès Kurrel/Erna
Herman Smits - Roel Kurrel
Alex Wilequet - Policeman
Henriette Cabanier - Grandma
Cyriel Van Gent - Gust the Postman
Paula Sleyp - Slien
Jan Reusens - Miel
Truus Demedts - Rita Mees
Fik Moeremans - Pukkel
Vera Veroft - Ariane Despinal
Robert Maes - Ivo/Baker Mees
Rik Bravenboer - Ward/Policeman
Marc Van Acker - Ben, as a boy
Marc De Munck - Wim
Fons Derre - Nelis, Forester
Bart Rouffaer - Zeppos, as a child
Jacques Germain - Plumber
Alice Toen - Martha
Dora Van der Groen - Beatrice
Ward Deravet - Baral
Jo Coppens - Blonde Frans/Slome Piet
François Bernard - Marinus
Jef Van Dalsen - Raf
Jos Simons - Max
Ivo Pauwels - Figaro
Mary Boduin - Usherette
Dolf Denis - Bernard Spriet
Jackie Morel - Blonde Frans/Slome Piet
René Peeters - Wittock
Piet Herman - Notary
R. Berghmans - Flower Girl
Frank Struys - Postman
André Delys - Policeman
Hans Caprino - Black Person
Jos Mahu - Doorman
Mrs Schepers - Manageress
Jaak Van Hombeek - Policeman
Paul Van Roey - Drillmaster post
Jaak Germain - Overseer

Music

The theme tune for the series was 'Living it up', recorded by Bert Kaempfert and His Orchestra. Featuring Kaempfert's characteristic trumpet sound, it became very popular at the time the first series was airing.

Cars
In series 1 Zeppos drove an Austin Champ ex-British Army Jeep style 4x4 vehicle powered by a Rolls-Royce engine.
Zeppos drove an amphibious vehicle in series 2 and 3, resulting in this type of car being referred to as a 'Zeppos' in Flanders even years later.

Location shooting

Most of the location filming was done in Roosdaal in Flemish Brabant.

In other languages/countries 
Series 1 was dubbed into English and screened by the BBC from October 1966. The dubbed version was also shown in Australia, Canada, Ireland, Jamaica and New Zealand, and was subtitled for broadcast in Japan, Egypt, Hong Kong and Nigeria. Short clips of the English dub are shown as an extra on one of the DVD sets.

It was broadcast in the original Dutch in Belgium, the Netherlands and (with subtitles) in Sweden and Finland.

In popular culture
There are commemorative Captain Zeppos cafés in both Amsterdam and Antwerp.

References

External links

 A dual-language Captain Zeppos tribute site

Flemish television shows
Belgian children's television shows
1964 Belgian television series debuts
Fictional characters from Flanders
Zeppos
1968 Belgian television series endings
Television characters introduced in 1968
Black-and-white Belgian television shows
Television shows set in Belgium
Eén original programming